The 2020 German Athletics Championships was the 120th edition of the national championship in outdoor track and field for Germany. It was held on 8 and 9 August at the Eintracht-Stadion in Braunschweig. It was due to serve as the selection meeting for Germany at the 2020 Summer Olympics and 2020 European Athletics Championships, which were both postponed due to the COVID-19 pandemic. The national athletics championship had been due to be held at the same time fifteen other national championship events as part of Die Finals 2020.

The track and field events were originally scheduled for 6 and 7 June, but were delayed due to restrictions in relation to the pandemic. The pole vault was originally scheduled for 4 June in a separate event in the city centre, but was also postponed until August and was ultimately held within the stadium. A total of 477 athletes competed across 34 events. The only other national championships to go ahead that year were the German Cross Country Championships (which preceded the pandemic restrictions) and the combined track and field events, which were held without an audience.

The interruption to track and field training and competition that year resulted in the absence of several prominent athletes and lower standards of performance at the event.

Championships
As usual, due to time or organizational reasons, various competitions were not held as part of the main event in Braunschweig. An independent German Relay Championships was scheduled with a full event programme for the first time, but that (like many other competitions) was abandoned.

Results

Men

Women

References

General
 Wettkampf-Resultate, Deutsche Meisterschaften 2020 leichtathletik.de 10 August 2020, retrieved 10 August 2020
 Deutsche Meisterschaften 2020 in Braunschweig, Berichte, Stimmen, Bilder, Videos leichtathletik.de 10 August 2020, retrieved 10 August 2020
 Meldeliste für die Hauptveranstaltung in Braunschweig (pdf 293 kB), retrieved 10 August 2020
 Vaterstetten Tag 3: Drei über 6.000 Punkte und Gold für Carolin Schäfer, Bericht Siebenkampf-DM mit Fotos leichtathletik.de 23 August 2020, retrieved 24 August 2020
 Vaterstetten Tag 3: Jannis Wolff und Malik Diakité im Zehnkampf vorn, Bericht Zehnkampf-DM mit Fotos auf leichtathletik.de 23 August 2020, retrieved 24 August 2020
 Crosslauf Meldeliste (pdf 316 kB), retrieved 11 March 2020
 Crosslauf Geländeplan (pdf 1,5 MB), retrieved 11 March 2020
 Titelkampf im Gelände: Die Entscheidungen der Cross-DM 2020 im Überblick, Berichte Crosslauf-DM mit Fotos auf leichtathletik.de 7 March 2020, retrieved 11 March 2020

External links 
 Official website of the Deutscher Leichtathletik-Verband (DLV; German Athletics Association) 
 Videoclips of the Cross Country Championships

2020
Sport in Braunschweig
Sports competitions in Lower Saxony
Athletics Championships
German Championships
Athletics Championships